Avlipi Zurabashvili (February 15, 1902 – August 15, 1994) was a prominent Georgian psychiatrist and neuromorphologist. Doctor of Medicine (1937), professor (1942), member of the Georgian Academy of Sciences (1955), members of the USSR Academy of Medical Sciences (1960). Is one of the pioneer researchers in Georgia into the ontogeny of the human CNS.

Biography 
Avlipi Zurabashvili was born on 15th February 1902 in the village of Bodbiskhevi, Signagi district, Georgia. In 1920 he finished the Tbilisi Technical High School, and in 1927 the medical faculty of Tbilisi State University. In 1927–1930 he served as an intern, and later assistant, at the chair of psychiatry of the same University. Between 1930 and 1938 Zurabashvili was post-graduate, and later senior researcher, at the Pavlov Institute of Physiology and the Bekhterev Psychoneurological Institute in Leningrad.

Zurabashvili is the author of basic studies in the fine structure of the brain, the reversibility of nervous cell lesions, pathopsychology, personology and pathopersonology that have received international recognition. He is the founder of the school of Georgian psychiatrist, widely known in this country and beyond its borders. Zurabashvili has 400 studies to his credit, published in Georgian, Russian, French, English, German, Italian, and other languages, including 22 monographs. Among his numerous pupils 80 are candidates and 40 doctors of science, as well as professors and members of scientific academies.  

It should be emphasized that Zurabashvili initiated a special line of research in neuromorphology, termed «synaptoarchitectonics» and «pathosynaptoarchitectonics», and in 1947 he published, for the first time, a  generalizing study: The Synapses (in Russian).

External links
  (Documentary film in Georgian)
  (in Georgian)

References

1902 births
1994 deaths
Academicians of the USSR Academy of Medical Sciences
Recipients of the Order of Lenin
Recipients of the Order of the Red Banner of Labour
Burials at Didube Pantheon
Psychiatrists from Georgia (country)
Tbilisi State University alumni
Soviet psychiatrists